Madison Hotel may refer to:

Madison Hotel and Cafe, West Yellowstone, Montana, listed on the National Register of Historic Places (NRHP) in Gallatin County
Madison Hotel (Atlantic City, New Jersey), NRHP-listed in Atlantic County
 Madison Hotel (Memphis, Tennessee), NRHP-listed
 Loews Madison Hotel, Washington, D.C., formerly "The Madison Hotel"

See also
Madison House (disambiguation)
Hotel Manger, former hotel in Boston, Massachusetts, also known as "Hotel Madison"